Redo Rinaldi (born 26 May 1994) is an Indonesian professional footballer who plays as an attacking midfielder for Liga 2 club Persipal Palu.

Club career

Persijap Jepara
In 2017, Rinaldi signed a contract with Indonesian Liga 2 club in the 2017 season.

PSPS Riau
He was signed for PSPS Riau to play in the Liga 2 in the 2018 season.

References

External links
 Redo Rinaldi at Soccerway
 Redo Rinaldi at Liga Indonesia

1994 births
Living people
Indonesian footballers
PSPS Riau players
Association football forwards
People from Pekanbaru
Sportspeople from Riau